Cobridge railway station was located on the Potteries Loop Line and served the Cobridge area of Stoke-on-Trent, Staffordshire, England. The station was located between Elder Road and Sandbach Road.

The station closed in 1964 when the passenger service on the Loop was withdrawn. The trackbed is now a footpath and the tunnel, which was to the south of the station, has been filled in.

References

Disused railway stations in Stoke-on-Trent
Railway stations in Great Britain closed in 1964
Railway stations in Great Britain opened in 1874
Former North Staffordshire Railway stations
Beeching closures in England